Războieni may refer to the following places in Romania:

 Castra of Războieni-Cetate, a fort in the Roman province of Dacia
 Războieni, a commune in Neamț County, and its village Războienii de Jos
 Războieni, a village in Casimcea commune, Tulcea County
 Războieni, a village in Ion Neculce commune, Iași County
 Răsboieni, a village in Țibănești commune, Iași County
 Războieni-Cetate, a village administered by Ocna Mureș town, Alba County

It is also the name of a military unit:
 151st Infantry Battalion "Războieni" of the 4th Territorial Army Corps of the Romanian Land Forces active from at least 1941 to 2000